"So Long, Mother" is a World War I era song released in 1917. Raymond B. Egan and Gus Kahn wrote the lyrics. Egbert Van Alstyne composed the music. The song was published by Jerome H. Remick & Co. of Detroit, Michigan. On the cover is a soldier and mother in an embrace. To the left is an inset photo of singer Al Jolson. It was written for both voice and piano.

The song is told from the soldier's point of view as he comforts his heavyhearted mother before he leaves for war. The chorus is as follows:

The sheet music can be found at Pritzker Military Museum & Library.

References

External links
 View the song MP3 and sheet music here.

Songs about parting
Songs about mothers
1917 songs
Songs of World War I
Songs with lyrics by Raymond B. Egan
Songs with lyrics by Gus Kahn
Songs with music by Egbert Van Alstyne